Jungle Queen may refer to:
 Tarzan's Peril, a 1951 film often shown under its alternate title Jungle Queen
 Jungle Queen (1991 film), an Indian film starring Satish Shah
 Jungle Queen (2001 film), a Pakistani film
 Jungle Queen (serial), a 1945 Universal movie serial
 "Jungle Queen", a 1982 song by Robert Sacchi
 'Jungle Queen', a cultivar of the Malaysian plant Alpinia purpurata
 Butterflies in the genus Stichophthalma

See also
Queen of the Jungle